Year 1388 (MCCCLXXXVIII) was a leap year starting on Wednesday (link will display full calendar) of the Julian calendar.

Events 
 January–December 
 February – The entire court of Richard II of England are convicted of treason by the Merciless Parliament, under the influence of the Lords Appellant, and are all either executed or exiled. Richard II effectively becomes a puppet of the Lords Appellant.
 April 9 – Battle of Näfels: Glarus, in alliance with the Old Swiss Confederacy, decisively defeat the Habsburgs, despite being outnumbered sixteen to one.
 May 18 – Battle of Buyur Lake: A Chinese Ming invasion force under General Lan Yu defeats a large Mongolian army under Uskhal Khan Tögüs Temür, and captures 100 members of the Northern Yuan Dynasty. Uskhal Khan is killed whilst trying to escape, and is succeeded as Khan of Mongolia by his rival, Jorightu. The invading Chinese army destroys Karakorum, the capital of the Mongol Empire.
 August 5 – Battle of Otterburn: A Scottish army, led by James Douglas, defeats an English army, capturing their leader, Harry Hotspur. Douglas is killed during the battle.
 August 27 – Battle of Bileća:  The Bosnians check the Ottoman advance.
 December 12 – Maria of Enghien sells the Lordship of Argos and Nauplia to the Republic of Venice.

 Date unknown 
 Mircea I of Wallachia takes control of the region of Dobruja, thus preventing its occupation by the Ottomans.
 Petru of Moldavia receives Pokuttya, as a pawn for a loan to the Polish king.
 The revision of Wycliffe's Bible is completed by John Purvey, and Wyclif's followers, known as the Lollards, begin to be persecuted in England.
 John of Gaunt, the uncle of Richard II of England, makes peace with Castile and gives up his claim to the Castilian throne, by allowing his daughter Catherine of Lancaster to marry Prince Henry, the eldest son of John I of Castile.
 The title of Prince of Asturias is created.
 Ramesuan is reinstated as King of Ayutthaya (modern-day southern Thailand), after dethroning and executing 17-year-old King Thong Lan.
 Goryeo Revolution: General Yi Seong-gye begins a four year revolution in Goryeo (modern-day Korea), after being ordered by King U of Goryeo to attack the superior Chinese army. King U is forced from power, and replaced by his son Chang.
 Tran Ngung overthrows Tran Hien as King of Vietnam.
 Omar I is succeeded by Sa'id, as King of the Kanem-Bornu Empire (modern-day east Chad and Nigeria). Sa'id is succeeded in the same year by Kade Alunu. Omar and Sa'id are both killed by Bilala invaders from the west.
 Ghiyas-ud-Din Tughluq II succeeds Firuz Shah Tughlaq as Sultan of Delhi.
 Charles VI of France takes complete control of the government, ending the regency of his uncle, Philip the Bold.
 The University of Cologne is established; by the 21st century it will be the largest university in Germany.
 Cozia Monastery is built in Wallachia.
 Ljubostinja Monastery is built in Serbia.

Births 
 September 14 – Claudius Clavus, Danish geographer
 date unknown
 Juliana Berners, English writer
 Thomas of Lancaster, 1st Duke of Clarence, second son of Henry IV of England (d. 1421)
 Thomas Montagu, 4th Earl of Salisbury (d. 1428)
 Dai Jin, Chinese painter (d. 1462)

Deaths 
 March 4 – Thomas Usk, English author
 August 14 – James Douglas, 2nd Earl of Douglas (killed in battle)
 July 15 – Agnes of Durazzo, titular Latin empress consort of Constantinople (d. 1313)
 August 15 – Adalbertus Ranconis de Ericinio, Bohemian theologian
 date unknown
 Simon de Burley, Lord Warden of the Cinque Ports
 Sultan Firuz Shah Tughlaq of Delhi
 Uskhal Khan, Emperor Tianyuan of Northern Yuan

References